Holly Patterson was born in Hamilton, New Zealand on 16 April 1994 and has represented New Zealand in association football at international level. She plays her club football with Claudelands Rovers.

Patterson was a member of the New Zealand U-17 side at the 2010 FIFA U-17 Women's World Cup in Trinidad and Tobago, making two appearances.

She played in all three of New Zealand's games at the 2012 FIFA U-20 Women's World Cup in Japan where they were eliminated at the group stages.

Patterson made her senior début as a substitute in a 1–2 loss to Switzerland on 7 March 2014.

References

External links

1994 births
Living people
New Zealand women's international footballers
New Zealand women's association footballers
Women's association football forwards